The National Air Race Museum (NARM) was a short-lived (1993-1994) aviation museum featuring the Golden Age of Racing and the Reno Air Races, located in Sparks, Nevada. Aircraft exhibited included an original, non-flying replica of Hughes H-1 Racer.

Aircraft displayed
 1944 Messerschmitt Bf 109G;
 1910 Curtiss pusher;
 1913 Deperdussin replica;
 1925 Curtiss R3C-2 replica;
 1926 Macchi M.39 replica;
 1931 Supermarine S.6B replica;
 1936 Rider R-4 #70 Schoenfeldt "Firecracker", winner, 1938 Greve Race in Cleveland;
 1938 Rider R-6 "Eightball" flown in Oakland and Cleveland, 1938-1939;
 1936 Beechcraft 17R Staggerwing;
 1971 Hanson Special #35 "Sump'n Else";
 1948 Miss Cosmic Wind #6 raced and owned by Bill Stead, Founder of Reno Air Races; 
 Formula-1 Racer Stinger #21 owned and flown by Astronaut Deke Slayton.

Artifacts on display included a pair of leather gloves left behind by Charles Lindbergh in 1927 when he flew into Blanchard Field, Reno's Original Airport.

The National Automobile Museum would rotate vintage vehicles through to complement antique hot air balloon display.

NARM Visitors were beneficiaries of exchange programs with a number of Museums including the National Air and Space Museum.

The museum included an Aviation Art Gallery, Gift Shop and "Fuselage Theater" built with commercial airliner interior for screening of movies.

Many of the air racers and the Bf 109G were on loan from the Air Museum in Chino, California. The Bf 109G was last seen, a few years ago, in the Planes of Fame satellite museum near the Grand Canyon at Valle Airport in Valle-Williams, Arizona, along with a letter from General Jimmy Doolittle's son informing NARM that Jimmy had become ill and was unable to attend NARM's Grand Opening.

As of May 10, 2008 many of the other racers and replicas are in a hangar at the Main Planes of Fame Museum in Chino.  Ed Maloney, President of the Air Museum, says the air racers will soon be featured in an air racing display. The non-flying replica of the Hughes H-1 Racer is currently in storage.

Opened in May 1993, NARM closed in February, 1994.  Over 20,000 visitors came through in less than a year of operation.  A learning center including Flight School for Kids at Risk and any other children who wanted to learn more about flying was under development at time of closure.

The Planes of Fame Museum briefly reopened NARM in September, 1994, before removing all contents of NARM which have been relocated to Chino and Valle-Williams.

References

Air racing
Aerospace museums in Nevada
Defunct museums in Nevada
1993 establishments in Nevada
1994 disestablishments in Nevada
Museums established in 1993
Museums disestablished in 1994